"The Matrimony" is a song by American hip hop recording artist Wale. It was released on March 2, 2015, as the second single from his fourth studio album The Album About Nothing (2015). The song, produced by Jake One, features a guest appearance from Usher. The song begins with a monologue from Jerry Seinfeld. The song samples artist Daniel "Danny Keyz" Tannenbaum.
 The song has peaked at number 70 on the US Billboard Hot 100 chart.

Music video
A music video for "The Matrimony" was released on June 8, 2015. It was directed by Sarah McColgan.

Chart performance
"The Matrimony" peaked at number 70 on the US Billboard Hot 100 chart. On July 10, 2018, the song was certified platinum by the Recording Industry Association of America (RIAA) for sales of over a million digital copies in the United States.

Charts

Weekly charts

Certifications

References

External links

2015 singles
2015 songs
Wale (rapper) songs
Usher (musician) songs
Maybach Music Group singles
Atlantic Records singles
Songs written by Usher (musician)
Songs written by Wale (rapper)
Songs written by DJ Khalil
Song recordings produced by DJ Khalil
Songs about marriage
Songs written by Sam Dew
Songs written by Daniel Tannenbaum